The R*tist 4*merly Known as Dangerous Toys is the fourth album by Dangerous Toys. It was released in 1995, and is the band's last studio album to date. The album's title is a parody of the name used in reference to American recording artist Prince from 1991 to 2000, while the cover artwork is a spoof of his 1988 album Lovesexy.

Track listing
"Share the Kill -3:22
"Cure the Sane - 4:09
"The Numb - 4:10
"Take Me Swiftly - 4:16
"Heard It All - 5:04
"Transmission - 5:45
"Words on the Wall - 3:29
"Better to Die - 4:42
"Down Inside - 3:20
"New Anger" - 3:40
"Monster Man" - 3:57
"To Live the Lie" - 6:52
"Mom & Dad" - 2:40

Personnel
Dangerous Toys
 Jason McMaster - vocals, bass
 Scott Dalhover - guitars
 Paul Lidel - guitars
 Mark Geary - drums

Production
Tom Fletcher - producer, engineer, mixing
Kevin Reeves - mastering
Harry B. Friedman II - executive producer

References

1995 albums
Dangerous Toys albums